Chaksang was a  Hansa A type cargo ship which was built in 1944 as Weserbrück by Deutsche Werft, Hamburg, Germany for Norddeutscher Lloyd. She was seized by the Allies in an incomplete state in 1945 and completed as Empire Fraser for the Ministry of War Transport (MoWT). She was sold in 1946 to the Indo-China Steam Navigation Co Ltd and renamed Chaksang. Suffering an on-board explosion and fire in September 1949, she sank at Hong Kong. She was subsequently raised and scrapped in 1950.

Description

The ship was powered by a two-cylinder compound steam engine driving a single screw propeller.

History
Weserbrück was built in 1944 as yard number 587 by Deutsche Werft, Hamburg for Norddeutscher Lloyd. She was seized in 1945 in an incomplete state at Hamburg and was completed as Empire Fraser for the Ministry of War Transport (MoWT). Her port of registry was London. The United Kingdom Official Number 180843 and Code Letters GDPV were allocated. She was operated under the management of the Indo-China Steam Navigation Co Ltd.

In November 1946, Empire Fraser transported a cargo of raw silk from Tokyo, Japan to the United Kingdom. This was the first silk imported into the United Kingdom after the end of the Second World War. Empire Fraser was sold to the Indo-China Steam Navigation Co Ltd in 1947 and was renamed Chaksang. On 7 September 1949, there was an onboard explosion and fire whilst the ship was moored at Hong Kong. Thirteen of her 66 crew were killed. She sank the next day. The ship had been delayed from sailing to Tientsin due to Typhoon Nelly and the cause of the explosion was sabotage. The ship was refloated on 22 March 1950. She was declared a constructive total loss and scrapped at Hong Kong.

References

1944 ships
Ships built in Hamburg
Ships sunk by non-combat internal explosions
Steamships of Germany
World War II merchant ships of Germany
Empire ships
Ministry of War Transport ships
Steamships of the United Kingdom
Maritime incidents in 1949
Explosions in 1949